Carlo Yaír Costly Molina (born 18 July 1982) is a Honduran professional footballer who plays as a striker for Liga de Ascenso club Lone FC.

Prior to moving to Europe, he played with Platense, where he was the top scorer of the Honduras Apertura in 2006–07.

Club career
Carlo Costly is the son of Anthony Costly. Despite being Honduran, he has close links to Mexico. His parents separated and his mother, soon after, married a Mexican. Costly moved to Mexico City when he was 14 years old and lived there for the following 11 years where he kicked off his football career. He had spells in the Mexican league with the reserve teams of Atlético Celaya, Monarcas Morelia, Atlas and Pumas UNAM.

He moved back to Honduras where the path to  international success began.  Despite leaving Mexico, Costly still keeps a house in the state of Nayarit. His big chance was given to him by Club Deportivo Platense and, with them, he became the top scorer of the Honduras Apertura 2006–07, scoring ten goals in 19 games.

His early success earned him a chance with Polish club GKS Bełchatów, who loaned him for half a season. Having impressed, the club spent a record €500,000 on signing him.

After a while he became unsettled in Poland, and was linked in the press with a move to Football League Championship side Plymouth Argyle, and supposedly linked with League One side Leeds United, before being reported to be on trial with Premier League side Birmingham City. Costly remained at GKS Bełchatów for the time being.

In January 2009, Costly joined Birmingham City of the second tier of English football on loan until the end of the 2008–09 season. He made his debut for the club on 7 February 2009, coming on as a second-half substitute in a 1–1 draw with Burnley. The loan was not made permanent at the end of the season.

On 24 January 2010, Costly was bought by SC Vaslui, signing a 3.5-year contract. He was injured and treated in Italy where they told him he would recover before 2010 FIFA World Cup, but he was unable to rejoin the Honduras national football team due to FIFA rules. He then went on to sign for Atlas in Mexico, once he recovered from his injury.

Costly spent the latter part of the 2011 Major League Soccer season on loan with Houston Dynamo. In September 2012, Veria F.C. announced Carlos Costly's transfer.

Costly joined China League One side Guizhou Zhicheng on 24 July 2013. On 4 August, he scored two goals in his debut against Yanbian Baekdu Tigers.

Costly signed with Real España on 2 January 2014. After the 2014 World Cup, he stated he would not return to the national team. He joined Gaziantepspor at the beginning of the 2014–15 season which was his first club since retiring from international duty.

In 2015 he joined Olimpia and in 2019 he ended his stage at Olimpia, signing contract with Marathón.

International career
Since scoring on his debut against Trinidad and Tobago in 2007, Costly has been a standout performer for the Honduras national team helping the Catrachos reach the semi-finals of the CONCACAF Gold Cup in 2009 and 2011. He is the Honduras national team's second-top goalscorer of all-time in Gold Cup matches, scoring eight goals, including a hat-trick against Grenada in the 2011 tournament.

He was an important member of the Honduran team that qualified for the 2010 FIFA World Cup but was unable to play at the tournament finals due to injury.

Costly scored seven goals in 13 appearances in 2014 FIFA World Cup qualification, including a hat-trick against Canada. In June 2014, he was named in the Honduran squad for the 2014 FIFA World Cup. Costly made his FIFA World Cup debut in a 3–0 defeat against France on 15 June. In the next match, he scored his country's first World Cup goal in 32 years as the team lost 2–1 to Ecuador. Costly started the final Honduras game of the 2014 FIFA World Cup but limped off injured in the 39th minute. Immediately after the match, Costly announced his retirement from the national team stating that "we have to give opportunities to the young players." Despite this, Costly was still called up to the Honduras national team for the 2018 World Cup qualifiers Costly's last ever match with Honduras was in a 0–0 draw with Australia in the first leg of the 2018 CONCACAF–AFC intercontinental playoff where he came on the 73rd minute replacing Anthony Lozano.

Career statistics

Club

International
Scores and results list Honduras goal tally first, score column indicates score after each Costly goal.

Honours
Houston Dynamo
 MLS Eastern Conference: 2011

Olimpia
 Liga Profesional de Honduras: 2015–16 C
 Honduran Supercup: 2016 I, 2016 II
 CONCACAF League: 2017

Marathón
 Honduran Supercup: 2019

Individual
 Top goalscorers in Liga Nacional de Honduras: 2006–07 A

References

External links
 
 
 
 
 

1982 births
Living people
Honduran footballers
People from San Pedro Sula
Association football forwards
Atlético Celaya footballers
Atlético Morelia players
Atlas F.C. footballers
Club Universidad Nacional footballers
Platense F.C. players
GKS Bełchatów players
Birmingham City F.C. players
FC Vaslui players
Houston Dynamo FC players
Veria F.C. players
Guizhou F.C. players
Real C.D. España players
Gaziantepspor footballers
C.D. Olimpia players
C.D. Marathón players
Liga Nacional de Fútbol Profesional de Honduras players
Honduran Liga Nacional de Ascenso players
Ekstraklasa players
English Football League players
Liga I players
Liga MX players
Major League Soccer players
Super League Greece players
China League One players
Süper Lig players
Honduras international footballers
2007 CONCACAF Gold Cup players
2009 CONCACAF Gold Cup players
2011 CONCACAF Gold Cup players
2014 FIFA World Cup players
Honduran expatriate footballers
Expatriate footballers in Mexico
Honduran expatriate sportspeople in Mexico
Expatriate footballers in Poland
Honduran expatriate sportspeople in Poland
Expatriate footballers in England
Honduran expatriate sportspeople in England
Expatriate footballers in Romania
Expatriate soccer players in the United States
Honduran expatriate sportspeople in the United States
Expatriate footballers in Greece
Expatriate footballers in China
Honduran expatriate sportspeople in China
Expatriate footballers in Turkey
Honduran expatriate sportspeople in Turkey